The women's slopestyle competition in snowboarding at the 2022 Winter Olympics was held on 5 February (qualification) and 6 February (final),  at the Genting Snow Park in Zhangjiakou.

Summary
Jamie Anderson won both previous slopestyle events at the Olympics, in 2014 and 2018, and qualified for the 2022 Olympics to defend her title. The 2018 silver medalist, Laurie Blouin, and the bronze medalist, Enni Rukajärvi, qualified at the Olympics as well. At the 2021–22 FIS Snowboard World Cup, only three slopestyle events were held before the Olympics. Kokomo Murase was leading the ranking, followed by Melissa Peperkamp and Reira Iwabuchi. Zoi Sadowski-Synnott is the 2021 world champion, with Jamie Anderson and Tess Coady being the silver and bronze medalists, respectively. Zoi Sadowski-Synnott is also the 2022 X Games winner, ahead of Jamie Anderson and Miyabi Onitsuka.

Zoi Sadowski-Synnott won the gold medal, becoming the first person from New Zealand to win a Winter Olympic gold medal. Julia Marino of the United States and Tess Coady of Australian won silver and bronze, respectively. For Marino and Coady, this was the first Olympic medal.

Qualification

A total of 30 snowboarders qualified to compete at the games. For an athlete to compete they must have a minimum of 50.00 FIS points in Big Air or Slopestyle on the FIS Points List on 17 January 2022 and a top 30 finish in a World Cup event in Big Air or slopestyle or at the FIS Snowboard World Championships 2021. A country could enter a maximum of four athletes into the event.

Results

Qualification
 Q — Qualified for the Final

The top 12 athletes in the qualifiers advanced to the Final.

Final

References

Women's snowboarding at the 2022 Winter Olympics